The Prisoner or: How I Planned to Kill Tony Blair is a 2006 documentary film by American documentary filmmaker Michael Tucker.

The film depicts Yunis Khatayer Abbas, an Iraqi journalist who was detained by US troops in 2003 and later imprisoned at Abu Ghraib prison for nine months.  Although innocent, he was accused by American military officials of plotting to assassinate then British Prime Minister Tony Blair, along with his two brothers.

Production notes
Director Tucker was shooting his film Gunner Palace, when he first encountered Abbas.

Abbas and his brothers were suspected of being a bomb-making cell planning to kill British prime minister Tony Blair during a planned visit to Iraq. In September 2003, 2/3 Field Artillery raided his home and Abbas and his brothers were detained while Tucker filmed Abbas proclaiming his innocence.

See also 

 Abu Ghraib Prison
 Human rights in post-Saddam Iraq
 Iraq War
 Human rights violations in Iraq

References

External links
 
 A review of the film by the Wild River Review
 Filmmaker website

Documentary films about the Iraq War
Abu Ghraib torture and prisoner abuse
2006 films
2000s English-language films
American documentary films
American war films
American crime films
American political films
2000s American films